Oldwick is an unincorporated community and census-designated place (CDP) located within Tewksbury Township in Hunterdon County, in the U.S. state of New Jersey. The area is served as United States Postal Service ZIP Code 08858. As of the 2000 United States census, the population for ZIP Code Tabulation Area 08858 was 177. The 2010 census data indicate a population of 144, comprising 68 housing units.

Oldwick was formerly known as New Germantown. It has a mixture of Victorian, Federal, New England and Georgian style homes, and is protected by historic legislation.  Historic sites within Oldwick include the Kline Farmhouse and the Oldwick Historic District.

Zion Lutheran Church in Oldwick was the oldest Lutheran parish in New Jersey. Justus Falckner of New York, the first Lutheran clergyman ever ordained in America, led the worshipers at the founding ceremony on August 1, 1714. The noted German Lutheran pastor, Henry Melchior Muhlenberg, was a member of this congregation from 1759 to 1760.

Oldwick is the corporate headquarters of the A. M. Best rating agency, and is the location of Mane Stream, formerly the Somerset Hills Handicapped Riding Center for adaptive riding and equine assisted therapy.

Demographics

Notable people

People who were born in, residents of, or otherwise closely associated with Oldwick include:
 Lawrence R. Hafstad (1904–1993), electrical engineer and physicist notable for his pioneering work on nuclear reactors.
 Frederica von Stade (born 1945), opera singer.
 Kate Whitman Annis (born ), general manager of the Metropolitan Riveters of the National Women's Hockey League.
George David Weiss (1921–2010), songwriter and former President of the Songwriters Guild of America.

Gallery

References

Tewksbury Township, New Jersey
Census-designated places in New Jersey
Palatine German settlement in New Jersey
Unincorporated communities in Hunterdon County, New Jersey
Unincorporated communities in New Jersey